Gregory of Tatev, or Grigor Tatevatsi (1346–1409 or 1410) was an Armenian philosopher, theologian and a saint in the Armenian Apostolic Church. 

Gregory was born in Tmkaberd in Georgia or Vayots Dzor in Siunik. He was educated at the monasteries of Tatev and Metzop.

Gregory was a faithful Miaphysite, at a time when the Armenian church was building relations with the Dyophysite Roman Catholic Church. He wrote against uniting the Armenian church with Rome.

In 1397, during perpetual invasions by the Timurids, he completed the Book of Questions, a basic and comprehensive theological outline.

A monument to Tatevatsi was unveiled on October 16, 2010 in Goris, Armenia.

References

External links

Gregory of Tatev
Gregory of Tatev

Armenian philosophers
Christian theologians
14th-century philosophers
1409 deaths
1346 births